Pictures is an album by American jazz drummer, keyboardist and composer Jack DeJohnette recorded in 1976 and released on the ECM label. DeJohnette plays drums and keyboards on all tracks and is joined by guitarist John Abercrombie on three compositions.

Reception
The Allmusic review awarded the album 2½ stars.

Track listing
All compositions by Jack DeJohnette except as indicated
 "Picture 1" - 4:48
 "Picture 2" - 7:56
 "Picture 3" (John Abercrombie, Jack DeJohnette) - 5:12
 "Picture 4" - 5:21
 "Picture 5" - 6:05
 "Picture 6" - 7:51
Recorded at Talent Studio in Oslo, Norway in February 1976

Personnel
 Jack DeJohnette - drums, piano, organ
 John Abercrombie - electric guitar, acoustic guitar (tracks 3, 4 & 5)

References 

ECM Records albums
Jack DeJohnette albums
1977 albums
Albums produced by Manfred Eicher